NTC Senec (Národné tréningové centrum Senec) is a football training center of the Slovak Football Association and a multi-use stadium in Senec, Slovakia. It is currently used mostly for football matches and is the home ground of ŠK Senec. The stadium holds 3,264 people.

International matches
NTC Senec has hosted one men's international match – a friendly for the Slovakia national football team.

Sources 
Národné tréningové centrum NTC Senec (in Slovak)

Football venues in Slovakia
Buildings and structures in Bratislava Region
Sport in Bratislava Region
National football academies